Walking Tall is a 1973 American neo-noir biographical vigilante action thriller film of Sheriff Buford Pusser, a professional wrestler-turned-lawman in McNairy County, Tennessee, played by Joe Don Baker. The film was directed by Phil Karlson. Based on Pusser's life, it has become a cult film with two direct sequels of its own, a TV movie, a brief TV series, and a remake that had its own two sequels.

Plot
Buford Pusser, at his wife Pauline's behest, retires from the professional wrestling ring, and moves back to Tennessee to start a logging business with his father, Carl Pusser. With a friend, he visits a gambling and prostitution establishment, the Lucky Spot, and is beaten up after catching the house cheating at craps. Pusser is seriously injured with a knife, and receives over 200 stitches. He complains to the sheriff, but is ignored, and soon becomes aware of the rampant corruption in McNairy County.

Later, working at his father's lumber mill, Pusser makes a club out of a tree branch. Late one night, Pusser waits until after the Lucky Spot is closed, and beats up the same thugs who left him for dead. The next day, Pusser is arrested; he represents himself at trial. At one point, he rips off his shirt and shows the jury his scars. He informs them, "If you let them do this to me and get away with it, then you're giving them the eternal right to do the same damn thing to any one of you!" The jury finds Pusser not guilty, and he decides to clean up the county, so runs for sheriff. The campaign is contentious against the incumbent sheriff, who is killed trying to run Pusser off the road. Pusser is elected, and becomes famous for being incorruptible and intolerant of crime, and for his array of four-foot hickory clubs, which he uses to great effect in dispatching criminals and destroying their clandestine gambling dens and illegal distilleries.

Some residents praise Pusser as an honest cop in a crooked town; others denounce him as a bully willing to break some laws to uphold others. Pusser is betrayed by one of his deputies, and is attacked several times. Finally,  Pauline and he are ambushed in their car. Pauline is killed and Pusser is seriously injured. He is admitted to the hospital after being shot, and while still in a neck-and-face cast, attends his wife's funeral. Afterward, he rams a sheriff cruiser through the front doors of the Lucky Spot, killing two of his would-be assassins. As he leaves with two deputies, the townspeople arrive and begin throwing the gambling tables out into the parking lot. They light a bonfire as an overwhelmed Pusser wipes tears from his eyes.

Cast

Reception

Box office
Walking Tall was a box-office smash. Produced on a budget of $500,000, the film grossed over $40 million, earning $10 million in theatrical rentals in the United States and Canada. The film played in rural areas before moving to larger cities, starting off slowly, but becoming a success through word-of-mouth.

Critical response
On Rotten Tomatoes, the film has an approval rating of 75% based on reviews from 12 critics. On Metacritic, it has a score of 60% based on reviews from seven critics.

Andrew Sarris of The Village Voice wrote: "Like it or not, Walking Tall is saying something very important to many people, and it is saying it with accomplished artistry. Vincent Canby of The New York Times wrote that, despite disliking the film, whose final scene he likened to "a nice KKK bonfire," he could "admire the manner in which it manipulates its audience through various notable clichés." Judith Crist of New York Magazine wrote: "Walking Tall grabs you where trash and violence invariably do, with excellent performers, shrewd plotting, and pacing."
Keith Phipps of The A.V. Club writing in 2002, describes the film as "an ultraviolent revenge fantasy" and "a masterpiece of over-the-top unintentional hilarity" and highly recommends the film, calling it an "unconscionably good time".

Accolades
The film is recognized by American Film Institute in these lists:
 2003: AFI's 100 Years...100 Heroes & Villains
 Buford Pusser – Nominated Hero

Sequels
The original Walking Tall was a hit, but the sequels, Walking Tall Part 2 (September 28, 1975), and Walking Tall: Final Chapter (August 10, 1977), both starring Bo Svenson, were far less profitable.

Remake

On December 9, 1978, CBS aired a television movie titled A Real American Hero: Buford Pusser, starring Brian Dennehy as the title character. The film is  set in 1967 and focused on  real-life Sheriff Buford Pusser, who goes after a criminal who has killed young people with his illegal moonshine.

In 2004, a remake starring professional wrestler Dwayne "The Rock" Johnson was made. Although it used elements from Pusser's life and the original Walking Tall, many things were changed. Johnson's character's name was now Chris Vaughn, the sheriff is trying to stop the selling of illegal drugs instead of illegal moonshine, and the film's setting became semirural Kitsap County, Washington, although it was filmed in Squamish, British Columbia, Canada. Two sequels to the remake were produced, and released in 2007: Walking Tall: The Payback and Walking Tall: Lone Justice, both made in Dallas, Texas, and released directly to DVD. These sequels starred Kevin Sorbo as Nick Prescott, the son of the town's sheriff, who takes the law into his own hands when his father is killed in a suspicious car accident.

See also
 List of American films of 1973
 Vigilante film

References

External links
 
 
 
 

1973 films
1970s action thriller films
1970s biographical films
American action thriller films
American biographical films
Films set in Tennessee
Films shot in Tennessee
McNairy County, Tennessee
Walking Tall (films)
Films directed by Phil Karlson
Films scored by Walter Scharf
American neo-noir films
American vigilante films
American films about revenge
Cinerama Releasing Corporation films
1970s English-language films
1970s American films